is a science fiction manga by Kazuo Umezu. It was serialized in Big Comic Spirits between 1982 and 1986. While best known for his horror manga, Umezu desired to minimize the horror and dedicate Shingo to exploring concepts of god, consciousness, and the metaphysical.

Summary
 is the 12-year-old son of a factory worker.  is the 12-year-old daughter of a diplomat. The two meet by chance during a field trip to the factory to see the new industrial robots, and they fall in love. They later sneak in to the factory to input various information into one of the robots, "Monroe".

However, Satoru's father loses his job and his family falls apart, while Marin's father is sent to the UK for work, ripping the two apart from each other. Fearing an end to their childhood and rejecting adulthood, the two decide to get married and have children. They ask the robot Monroe how to create children and are told to jump from the top of 333 (to whatever is there). They interpret this to be the 333-meter-tall Tokyo Tower. They leap and a miracle happens: a spark of consciousness is born within the robot Monroe. Satoru and Marin are separated after this without knowing about their child. Unable to forget Marin, Satoru inputs his feelings for her in Monroe before moving. As its conscious grows, in a search for its origins, the robot searches for Marin to convey Satoru's message.

The robot Monroe chooses a name for himself: —a masculine name—taking one character each from his father and mother's names. Shingo continues to evolve and travels to Europe to find his mother. Marin is in the UK, where she has been deceived by a boy named Robin. Shingo saves his mother and receives a message from her about her feelings for Satoru.

Shingo seeks his father—now living in Niigata—to convey Marin's message. Undertaking much damage, Shingo slowly falls apart and beings to loose his memory. With his final energy, he at last meets his father with only one word left in his memory: "love".

Radio adaptation
The series was adapted for broadcast by NHK FM Broadcast in 15 parts between October 14, 1991, and November 1, 1991. It was later rebroadcast on October 5, 1992, through October 23, 1992, and October 11, 1993, through October 29, 1993.

Musical adaptation
A musical adaptation was produced by Kanagawa Arts Theatre (KAAT) and performed at the New National Theatre Tokyo between December 2016 and January 2017. The lead roles were played by Mitsuki Takahata and Mugi Kadowaki.

Art exhibit
An art exhibit titled "Kazuo Umezz The Great Art Exhibition" opened at Tokyo City View in Roppongi Hills. Running from January 28 through March 25, 2022, it features a semi-continuation of the Shingo series. Titled , it consists of 101 paintings, each with a short description that forms another story. This is Umezu's first new work in 27 years since the completion of Fourteen, and 36 years since the completion of Shingo.

Reception
In January 2018, Shingo won the Heritage Selection (LA SELECTION patrimoin) award at the 45th Angoulême International Comics Festival in Angoulême, France.

References

External links
 Kazuo Umezz The Great Art Exhibition 
 Tokyo City View: Kazuo Umezz The Great Art Exhibition 

1982 manga
Kazuo Umezu
Science fiction anime and manga
Seinen manga
Shogakukan manga